Populus × canadensis, known as Canadian poplar or Carolina poplar, is a naturally occurring hybrid of Populus nigra and Populus deltoides. Cultivars include 'Robusta' and 'Aurea' (golden poplar  or golden Carolina poplar), which has won the Royal Horticultural Society's Award of Garden Merit.

References

canadensis
Ornamental trees
Plant nothospecies